Polyaspis is a genus of mites in the family Polyaspididae. There are about six described species in Polyaspis.

Species
These six species belong to the genus Polyaspis:
 Polyaspis criocephali Wisniewski, 1980
 Polyaspis lamellipes Banks
 Polyaspis madagascarensis
 Polyaspis patavinus Berlese, 1881
 Polyaspis repandus Berlese, 1903
 Polyaspis sansonei Berlese, 1916

References

External links

 

Acari
Articles created by Qbugbot